Samea figuralis is a moth in the family Crambidae. It was described by Francis Walker in 1869. It is found in the Democratic Republic of the Congo.

References

Spilomelinae
Moths described in 1869